The 2015 NCAA Division II Field Hockey Championship was the 27th women's collegiate field hockey tournament to determine the top NCAA Division II college field hockey team in the United States. The semifinals and championship match were played at Steph Pettit Stadium at Bloomsburg University in Bloomsburg, Pennsylvania from November 20 to 22, 2015.

Millersville are the defending national champions.

Qualified teams
 The total number of teams remained fixed at 6. Teams qualified for the tournament based on their regional rankings at the end of the season, with the top three teams from each region making the final bracket.

Atlantic Region

East Region

Bracket

See also 
NCAA Division I Field Hockey Championship
NCAA Division III Field Hockey Championship

References 

2015
2015 in American women's sports
2015 in women's field hockey
2015 in sports in Pennsylvania